In circuit theory, flux linkage is a property of a two-terminal element. It is an extension rather than an equivalent of magnetic flux and is defined as a time integral

where  is the voltage across the device, or the potential difference between the two terminals. This definition can also be written in differential form as a rate

Faraday showed that the magnitude of the electromotive force (EMF) generated in a conductor forming a closed loop is proportional to the rate of change of the total magnetic flux passing through the loop (Faraday's law of induction). Thus, for a typical inductance (a coil of conducting wire), the flux linkage is equivalent to magnetic flux, which is the total magnetic field passing through the surface (i.e., normal to that surface) formed by a closed conducting loop coil and is determined by the number of turns in the coil and the  magnetic field, i.e.,

where  is the flux density, or flux per unit area at a given point in space.

The simplest example of such a system is a single circular coil of conductive wire immersed in a magnetic field, in which case the flux linkage is simply the flux passing through the loop.

The flux  through the surface delimited by a coil turn exists independently of the presence of the coil. The distinction relies heavily on intuition, and the term "flux linkage" is used mainly in engineering disciplines. Theoretically, the case of a multi-turn induction coil is explained and treated perfectly rigorously with Riemann surfaces: what is called "flux linkage" in engineering is simply the flux passing through the Riemann surface bounded by the coil's turns, hence no particularly useful distinction between flux and "linkage".

Due to the equivalence of flux linkage and total magnetic flux in the case of inductance, it is popularly accepted that the flux linkage is simply an alternative term for total flux, used for convenience in engineering applications. Nevertheless, this is not true, especially for the case of memristor, which is also referred to as the fourth fundamental circuit element. For a memristor, the electric field in the element is not as negligible as for the case of inductance, so the flux linkage is no longer equivalent to magnetic flux. In addition, for a memristor, the energy related to the flux linkage is dissipated in the form of Joule heating, instead of being stored in magnetic field, as done in the case of an inductance.

References

 L. O. Chua, "Memristor – The Missing Circuit Element", IEEE Trans. Circuit Theory, vol. CT_18, no. 5, pp. 507–519, 1971.

Electromagnetism
Thought experiments in physics